Four rivers may refer to:

 The four rivers in the Old Testament Garden of Eden (Pishon, Gihon, Tigris, and Euphrates)
 The four rivers that water the world in Hindu scripture (Ganges, Indus, Oxus, and Śita)
 Four Rivers Bay, Nunavut, Canada
 Four Rivers Transportation, an American railroad holding company based in Wilmington, Delaware
 Fountain of the Four Rivers, a 17th-century fountain in Rome designed by Gian Lorenzo Bernini (Danube, Nile, Ganges, La Plata)
 Sichuan province, China

See also 
 Four Major Rivers Project, multi-purpose green growth project in South Korea